Orlando Garrido (4 February 1924 – 24 June 2015) was a Cuban weightlifter who competed in the 1948 Summer Olympics and in the 1952 Summer Olympics.

References

1924 births
2015 deaths
Cuban male weightlifters
Olympic weightlifters of Cuba
Weightlifters at the 1948 Summer Olympics
Weightlifters at the 1952 Summer Olympics
Pan American Games bronze medalists for Cuba
Pan American Games medalists in weightlifting
Weightlifters at the 1951 Pan American Games
Medalists at the 1951 Pan American Games
20th-century Cuban people
21st-century Cuban people